Aeronautical mobile service (short: AMS; also: aeronautical mobile radiocommunication service') is – according to Article 1.32 of the International Telecommunication Union's (ITU) Radio Regulations (RR) – defined as "A mobile service between aeronautical stations and aircraft stations, or between aircraft stations, in which survival craft stations may participate; emergency position-indicating radiobeacon stations may also participate in this service on designated distress and emergency frequencies."

Classification
Variations of this radiocommunication service in line to the ITU Radio Regulations article 1 are as follows :
Mobile service (article 1.24)
Aeronautical mobile service (article 1.32)
Aeronautical mobile (R)° service (article 1.33)
Aeronautical mobile (OR)°° service (article 1.34)
Aeronautical mobile-satellite service (article 1.35)
Aeronautical mobile-satellite (R)° service (article 1.36)
Aeronautical mobile-satellite (OR)°° service (article 1.37)
(R)° = abbreviation to route flights (route)(OR)°° = abbreviation to flights others than on routes (off-route)

Frequency allocation
The allocation of radio frequencies is provided according to Article 5 of the ITU Radio Regulations (edition 2012).

In order to improve harmonisation in spectrum utilisation, the majority of service-allocations stipulated in this document were incorporated in national Tables of Frequency Allocations and Utilisations which is within the responsibility of the appropriate national administration. The allocation might be primary, secondary, exclusive, and shared.
primary allocation:  is indicated by writing in capital letters (see example below)
secondary allocation: is indicated by small letters
exclusive or shared utilization: is within the responsibility of administrations 
However, military usage, in bands where there is civil usage, will be in accordance with the ITU Radio Regulations. In NATO countries military utilizations will be in accordance with the NATO Joint Civil/Military Frequency Agreement (NJFA).

 Example of frequency allocation

See also
 Radio station
 Radiocommunication service

Sources 

 International Telecommunication Union (ITU)

Airbands
Mobile services ITU